Nicaragua and its two OTI member stations Telenica and Televicentro Nicaragua debuted in the OTI Festival in 1974 in Acapulco as did many of their Central American neighbours. The first Nicaraguan entrant in the contest was the well known Hernaldo Zúñiga who got the seventh place scoring five points. Canal 2 es ahora es propiedad del gobierno de Nicaragua

History 
Nicaragua was the most successful of the Central American countries In the OTI Festival. In fact, the broadcasters of that country got their first and only victory in Madrid in 1977 with the performer Guayo Gonzalez and his song "Quincho Barrilete" (Quincho, the boy of the little barrel) which was warmly welcomed by the audience and by the juries because its deep message. "Quincho Barrilete" seemed to be a song for children, but the lyrics talked against the social injustices, denouncing the widespread poverty and the lack of sensitivity of the leading class. The song managed to win the national final despite the Anastasio Somoza Debayle regime.

In 1978, Managua, the capital city of Nicaragua, was supposed to host the OTI Festival according to the original rules, but that year marked the beginning of the Nicaraguan Revolution which ended in a bloody civil war that killed a lot of people and destroyed completely the country. Because of that situation, the host city was moved to Santiago. and Nicaraga was forced to withdraw from 1978 to 1980.

In 1980, the Central American country returned to the event selecting big names such as Carlos Mejía Godoy y los de Palancagüina, but the Nicaraguan results were not very successful until 1990. In the edition of 1990, which was held in Las Vegas, the singer Katia Cardenal got the second place for her country with the song "Dame tu corazón". Since then, Telenica and Televicentro took part in the competition until the last show in 2000, in which Lya Barrioz turned into the very last Nicaraguan entrant in the event.

National Final 

Nicaragua, just like Mexico, Chile, Guatemala and later Cuba, held a national final which was annually organised both by Telenica and Televicentro Nicaragua. This national final was seen as a platform for young Nicaraguan talents who wanted to be recognised in Latin America. The usual venue of the "Nicaraguan National OTI Contest" was the Rubén Darío National Theatre and the winner of the preselection was elected by a jury composed by famous local singers, radio presenters and TV personalities. The end of the main OTI festival also led to the end of this national final which was seen as a tragedy for the local musicians.

Contestants

References 

OTI Festival
Nicaraguan music